Cilegon (Indonesian: Kota Cilegon,) is a major coastal industrial city in Banten province, Indonesia, covering . It is located on the island of Java. The city had a population of 374,464 at the 2010 Census and 434,896 at the 2020 Census; the official estimate as at mid 2022 was 450,271.

Among the factories located in Cilegon are Krakatau Steel Company, a vital company in Indonesia, which produces steel for industrial (domestic and foreign) needs, and Asahimas Chemical Company. The other name for Cilegon is "Steel City" since the city is the largest steel producer in Southeast Asia, about 6 million tons of steel produced each year in the Industrial Area Krakatau Steel, Cilegon. Additionally Cilegon is one of the vital state objects. This is because in this town there is a wide range of other vital objects such as the Merak Harbour, Krakatau Steel Industrial Zone (including the PT. Krakatau Steel Tbk, Asahimas, Siemens, KS - POSCO joint venture, Chandra Asri, and Pertamina), PLTU Suralaya, Power plant Krakatau, Krakatau Tirta Industrial Water Treatment Plant, The Sunda Strait Bridge Construction (Lot Plan) & Sunda Strait Industrial Zones.

Geography 
Cilegon is located on the most northwest coast of Java island, at the mouth of the Cilegon River on Ciwandan Bay, which is an inlet of the Sunda Strait. It is administratively a semi-enclave within Serang Regency, as it borders with Serang Regency in the east and south, while it borders with Sunda Strait in the north and west.

Administrative districts 
The City of Cilegon is divided into eight districts (kecamatan), tabulated below with their areas and their populations at the 2010 Census and the 2020 Census, together with the official estimates as at mid 2022. The table also includes the locations of the district administrative centres, the number of administrative villages (urban kelurahan) in each district, and its postal codes.

Notes: (a) including 5 small offshore islands.

Climate 
Cilegon has a hot and humid climate near the boundary between tropical rainforest (Af) and tropical monsoon climate (Am) according to the Köppen climate classification system. Despite being located relatively close to the equator, the city has distinct wet and dry seasons. The wet season in Cilegon covers the majority of the year, running from October through May. The remaining four months forms the city's dry season.

Demographics 
From 1991 to 2005 the population of Cilegon grew 47.18%. Cilegon's population from 2001 to 2005 grew on average 2.66% per year.

Cilegon is the fourth largest city in Banten. The high population growth rate of Cilegon is primarily caused by migrants entering the city.

Religion 
In 2019 there are 382 mosques and 287 musallas in Cilegon, without any churches, Hindu temples, or Buddhist viharas, even though there are 6,740 Protestants, 1,743 Catholics, 215 Hindus, 215 Buddhists, and 7 Confucians in the city. A proposal to build a Batak Protestant Christian Church in Cilegon was rejected  by local residents, which forces religious services to be conducted in Serang City.

Media

Newspaper
 Radar Banten (Jawa Pos)

Radio
 91.8 Top FM Cilegon
 95.3 FM Banten Radio
 96.9 FM Sam Radio
 102.0 Cilegon Mandiri FM (Siaran Pemda)
 105.2 Cilegon Pass FM
 107.7 Gema Suara Tercinta
 107.9 Flash Radio FM

References

External links 

Cilegon Government Site 

 
Populated places in Banten
1987 establishments in Indonesia
Populated coastal places in Indonesia